Sabahat is a feminine Turkish given name of Arabic origin meaning beauty, grace and handsomeness.

Notable people with the name include:

 Sabahat Akkiraz (born 1955), Turkish folk music singer and former Member of Parliament for Istanbul
 Ayda Field born as Ayda Sabahat Evecan (born 1979), American model and actress
 Sabahat Ali Bukhari (born 1968), Pakistani actress
 Sabahat Rasheed (born 1982), Pakistani former cricketer
 Sirak M. Sabahat (born 1981), Israeli actor

References 

Turkish feminine given names